Holmes District School Board (HDSB) is a school district headquartered in Bonifay, Florida. It serves Holmes County.

Schools
High schools:
 Holmes County High School
 Ponce de Leon High School

Elementary:
 Ponce de Leon Elementary School

Other:
Bethlehem School
Bonifay K-8 school
Poplar Springs School
The GAP

References

External links
 

School districts in Florida
Education in Holmes County, Florida